The Eastern Region is located in south Ghana and is one of the sixteen administrative regions of Ghana. Eastern region is bordered to the east by the Lake Volta, to the north by Bono East Region and Ashanti region, to the west by Ashanti region, to the south by Central region and Greater Accra Region. Akans are the dominant inhabitants and natives of Eastern region and Akan, Ewe, Krobo, Hausa and English are the main spoken languages. The capital town of Eastern Region is Koforidua.The Eastern region is the location of the Akosombo dam and the economy of the Eastern region is dominated by its high-capacity electricity generation. Eastern region covers an area of 19,323 square kilometres, which is about 8.1% of Ghana's total landform.

Hydro project 
High-capacity electricity generation Akosombo Hydroelectric Project contains three main tributaries: the Black Volta; the White Volta and the Red Volta and the Akosombo Hydroelectric Project flows into the Gulf of Guinea on the Atlantic Ocean.The Akosombo Dam was completed in 1965 as part of the Volta River Project. The dam measures at 440 ft (134 m) above ground level. The large electric power generating capacity is 912 megawatts. The dam helps supplies electricity to an economically important town called Tema.

Education

Senior High Schools 

 Abetifi Presbyterian senior High School
 Abetifi technical school
 Abetifi vocational institute
 Abuakwa state college
 Abuakwa State College
 Aburi Girls' Senior High School
 Aburi Presby Senior High
 Adeisu Presbyterian Senior High School
 Adonten Senior High School
 Adukrom Presbyterian Senior High Technical School
 Akim Oda Senior High School
 Akim Achiase Senior High School
 Akim Swedru Senior High School
 Akro Senior High Technical School, Odumase Krobo
 Akwamuman Senior High School
 Akosombo International School
 Anum Presby Senior High School
 Asafo senior high
 Asamankese Senior High School
 Asesewa Senior High School
 Akuse methodist senior high school
 Akro senior high School
 Asuom Senior High School
 Begoro Presbyterian Senior High School
 Benkum Senior High School
 Boso Senior High Tech School
 Donkorkrom Agric Senior High School
 Ghana Senior High School, Koforidua
 H'Mount Sinai Senior High School
 Islamic girls senior high
 Kibi Secondary Technical Senior High School
 Kibi Technical Institute
 Klo Agogo Senior High School
 Koforidua Senior High Technical School
 Krobo Girls Senior High School
 Kwabeng Anglican Senior High and Technical School
 Legacy Girls' College, Akuse 
 Mangoase Senior High School
 Manya Krobo Senior High School
 Methodist Girls' High School (Mamfe)
 Akuse Methodist Senior High Technical School
 Mpraeso Senior High School
 New Abirem Senior High School
 New Juaben Senior High Commercial School
 New Nsutam Senior High School
 Nifa Senior High School
 Nkawkaw Senior High School
 Nkwatia Presby Senior High School
 Nsawam Senior High school
 Ofori Panin Senior High School
 Okuapeman Senior High School
 Osino Senior High School
 Oti Boateng Senior High School
 Oyoko Methodist Senior High School
 Presbyterian Senior High School, Akuapim-Mampong
 Presbyterian Senior High Technical School, Adukrom
 Pope John Senior High School and Minor Seminary
 Saint Francis Senior High School
 Saviour Senior High School
 Sekyere Senior High School
 Somanya Senior High Technical School.
 St Fidelis Senior High School
 St Matins Senior High School
 St Paul's Senior Secondary School
 St. Peter's Boys Senior High School
 St Roses Senior High (Akwatia)
 St Stephens senior and technical
 St Thomas Senior High Technical School, Asamankese
 Suhum Presbyterian Senior High School
 Suhum Senior High and Technical School
 W.B.M.Zion Senior High School, Old Tafo,
 Yilo Krobo Senior High School
The region also boasts of some quality basic schools such as Hecta School Complex, established in 1962, and others.

Colleges 

Kibi Presbyterian College of Education
Presbyterian College of Education, Akropong
Presbyterian Women's College of Education
Mount Mary College of Education, Somanya
Seventh Day Adventist College of Education, Asokore
Abetifi Presbyterian College of Education

Universities
Ashesi University
All Nations University
University College of Agriculture and Environmental Studies
Koforidua Technical University
Presbyterian University College (Abetifi Kwahu)
 Presbyterian University college (Akropong)

Districts

District changes
Achiase District was carved out of the existing Birim South District and inaugurated on 22 February 2019. The Afram Plains District has since been split into two and renamed as Kwahu Afram Plains North District with its capital being Donkorkrom and Kwahu Afram Plains South District with its capital also being Tease. The Akuapim South District, East Akim District and Kwahu West Districts have been upgraded to Municipal status with the addition of Birim Central Municipal District which is entirely new.
Other new districts include Akyemansa District and Kwahu East District. The Manya Krobo District has been split into Lower Manya Krobo District and Upper Manya Krobo District.

Administrative divisions
The political administration of the region is through the local government system. Under this administration system, the region is divided into 33 MMDA's (made up of 0 Metropolitan, 13 Municipal and 20 Ordinary Assemblies). Each District, Municipal or Metropolitan Assembly, is administered by a Chief Executive, representing the central government but deriving authority from an Assembly headed by a presiding member elected from among the members themselves. The MMDA's were increased from 9 to 15 in 1988; then from 15 to 17 in 2004; then from 17 to 21 in 2008; then from 21 to 26 in 2012; and recently from 26 to 33 in 2018. The current list is as follows:

Culture

Tourist Sites 

 Aburi Botanical Garden

Boti Waterfalls
Akosombo Dam
Shai Hills Resource Reserve
Umbrella Rock
Atewa Range Forest Reserve
Lake Volta
The Big Tree at Oda
Tetteh Quarshie Cocoa Farm
Bead Factory
Dodi Island

 Adomi Bridge
 Akaa Waterfalls
 Ghana Bike and Hike Tours
 Kwahu plateau
 Akwawa Mountain Peak

Famous native citizens

References

Works cited
 

 
Regions of Ghana